Geltz is a surname. Notable people with the surname include:

 James A. Geltz (1900–1963), American attorney and politician
 Steve Geltz (born 1987), American baseball player
 Tim Geltz, 20th century American soccer player

See also
Goelz